The 1973 Monte Carlo Rally (formally the 42ème Rallye Automobile de Monte-Carlo), run in late January and hosted in the principality of Monaco, was the first rally on the Fédération Internationale de l'Automobile's (FIA) new World Rally Championship (WRC) inaugural season, making it the first ever WRC event to be held.

Report 
At this time, the Monte-Carlo rally was structured as a concentration rally, with teams beginning competition in some nine different cities, with the first objective of the rally being to reach Monte Carlo, followed by two legs of competitive special stages around Monaco and southeastern France. Traditionally run on tarmac roads commonly covered in snow and ice, especially at higher altitudes, bad weather did force cancellation of two special stages in 1973.

In 1973, and for several years afterward, only manufacturers were given points for finishes in WRC events. Alpine Renault dominated the event, a portent of their further success during the season with their Alpine-Renault A110 1800 car. They would take all three podium positions and five of the top six places.

Results 

Source: Independent WRC archive

Special stages

Championship standings after the event

References

External links 
 Official website of the World Rally Championship
 1973 Rally Monte Carlo  at Rallye-info 

Monte Carlo
Monte Carlo Rally
1973 in Monégasque sport
Monte